Lisburn railway station serves the city of Lisburn in County Antrim, Northern Ireland.

History

The station was opened on 12 August 1839 by the Ulster Railway. The station buildings were rebuilt in 1878 to designed by William Henry Mills, for the then newly formed Great Northern Railway of Ireland (GNRI).

On Wednesday 20 December 1978, there was a fatal collision between two trains. The fire brigade attended and cut out the person killed from the wreckage. A number of other people were treated for minor injuries and shock.

Current building

It has been renovated, with a new waiting area on platform 1, new toilets and vending machines. In addition, on platforms 2 and 3, a coffee shop operates on weekday mornings, to accommodate commuters travelling towards Belfast. To make the station more accessible, lifts have been installed on each platform.

Station House
There is a station house built in Great Northern Railway of Ireland (GNR) style. It is now in private ownership.

Northern Ireland Digital Film Archive
The Northern Ireland Digital Film Archive holds a clip of black and white film.  It was made in 1897 and was filmed from a moving train going through Lisburn Railway Station on the way from Belfast to Kingstown (now Dún Laoghaire), Dublin. The name of the station can be seen and in addition, the view includes the platform, train carriages, station buildings and large houses along the length of North Circular Road, Lisburn.

Service

Extra services run at peak times, and the service reduces to hourly operation in the evenings.

Only one Enterprise service calls at the station, the Sunday 09:13 to Dublin Connolly.

On Sundays there is an hourly NIR service in each direction.

Enterprise connections
The line is also used by rail passengers changing at Dublin Connolly onto the DART to Dún Laoghaire for example or travelling to Dublin Port for the Irish Ferries or Stena Line to Holyhead, and then by train along the North Wales Coast Line to London Euston and other destinations in England and Wales.

Former services
Until 2003, Lisburn was also a stop on the Belfast-Derry railway line. However, in 2001, the Bleach Green route (via Mossley and Templepatrick) was re-opened, after being closed in 1978. This provided a faster route for Derry Line trains than the Lisburn-Antrim line. A skeleton service was operated on this line until 2003, when passenger services were withdrawn.
The other reason why the line was cut was because of the congestion on the route which caused considerable problems with the Enterprise Service for over 20 years. The line itself is still maintained for rolling stock transfers and emergency diversions.

Former lines
The Ulster Railway brought trains from Belfast Great Victoria Street railway station to Portadown and Armagh railway station in Armagh.  Later the Great Northern Railway of Ireland had a much more extensive system with trains to Omagh, Enniskillen, Bundoran, Strabane and Derry being linked, which in the 1950s and 1960s was closed west of Portadown.

Future lines
There is a possibility of reopening the line to Antrim and possible reopening of the line from Portadown to Armagh railway station in Armagh.  The Armagh Line has been listed in proposed plans to reopen the line.

See also
Lisburn West railway station

References

External links

 Digital Film Archive – Official web site, provided by Northern Ireland Screen.

Railway stations in County Antrim
Buildings and structures in Lisburn
Railway stations served by NI Railways
Railway stations served by Enterprise
Grade B1 listed buildings
Railway stations in Northern Ireland opened in 1839